The 2018 Malaysian motorcycle Grand Prix was the eighteenth round of the 2018 MotoGP season. It was held at the Sepang International Circuit in Sepang on 4 November 2018.

Classification

MotoGP

 Jordi Torres suffered a broken finger in a crash during practice and withdrew from the event.
 Jorge Lorenzo withdrew from the event following Friday practice due to effects of wrist injury suffered at the Thailand GP and was replaced by Michele Pirro.

Moto2

Moto3

Championship standings after the race
Bold text indicates the World Champions.

MotoGP

Moto2

Moto3

Notes

References

Malaysia
Motorcycle Grand Prix
Malaysian motorcycle Grand Prix
Malaysian motorcycle Grand Prix